The Windhoek Islamic Center or Soweto Islamic Centre is a mosque in Windhoek, Khomas Region, Namibia.

History
The center was established in 1986.

See also
 Islam in Namibia

References

1986 establishments in Dominica
Buildings and structures in Windhoek
Islam in Namibia
Mosques completed in 1986
Mosques in Africa
Religious buildings and structures in Namibia